WTPM may refer to:

 WTPM (FM), a radio station (92.9 FM) licensed to serve Aguadilla, Puerto Rico
 WTPM-LD, a low-power television station (channel 28, virtual 45) licensed to serve Mayaguez-Anasco, Puerto Rico